Laure Cohen, known by her stage name Koxie, is a French singer of Tunisian origin, who came to prominence through her 2007 hit "Garçon" that topped the French Official Singles Chart. She was born in Neuilly-sur-Seine, Hauts-de-Seine département west of Paris on 26 February 1977. She released her self-titled debut album Koxie in 2007. She is signed since June 2007 to AZ French record label affiliated with Universal Music France.

Career
She started in hip hop music very early. She went to New York where she studies acting and dancing in Broadway Dance Center. Upon graduation, she returned to France opening her own studio FAME in 1998, an arts school covering theater, music, dance and cinema. She has also shot a number of short films, most notably Les Mauvais Joueurs in 2005.

She also worked in the French music station Fun Radio and with radio and TV presenter Arthur in Europe 2. After that she started her solo career with single "Garçon" using sampling of Dr. Dre and speaking against sexism and vulgar lyrics. She was immediately targeted by French radio DJ Difool through the Skyrock radio who launched an anti-Koxie campaign, even launching a mock version of "Garçon" entitled "Gare aux cons" by comedian  Axelle Laffont. Still "Garçon" topped the French Official Singles Chart for 2 weeks in August 2007 and was also a hit in Switzerland reaching #44.

Based on her commercial success, Koxie released her studio album Koxie and a follow-up single "Ma meilleure amie". In early 2012, she is releasing her second studio album, with a pre-release single from the forthcoming album under the title "Le prince charmant".

Discography

Albums
2007: Koxie
Track list
Intro
Rêver de ça koxie
Garçon
Sortir de l’ombre
Ma meilleure amie
Seule avec toi
Sacré salah
Plus de place pour les rêves
J’aime
Je fais des rimes
Femme de football fan
Sans essayer
La force de croire

2012: TBA

Singles
2007: "Garçon" (#1 in France, #44 in Switzerland)
2008: "Ma meilleure amie" (#45 in France)
2010: "Daisy Luzion"
2011: "Le prince charmant"

References

External links
 
Koxie page on Universal Music France site
Koxie on Skyrock

1977 births
Living people
French people of Tunisian descent
Cours Florent alumni
21st-century French singers
21st-century French women singers